Count Héder Viczay de Loós et Hédervár (2 August 1807 – 23 December 1873) was a Hungarian traveler, amateur archaeologist, collector, Imperial and Royal Privy Councillor. He was the last member of the old noble Viczay family.

Background
His parents were Count Ferenc Viczay, an Imperial and Royal Chamberlain and Countess Amália Zichy de Zich et Vásonkeő. He had three siblings:
 Károly (1802–1867): Imperial and Royal Privy Councillor, he married Mária Khuen, aunt of later Prime Minister Károly Khuen-Héderváry, in 1829.
 Adolf (1804–1873): uhlan captain, his wife was Leokádia Anasztázia Lichnovszky since 1837.
 Antónia (1812–1903): Her first husband was Count Pál Esterházy (1806–1857), the second was Adolf Mengen, an Imperial and Royal Major General.

External links
 Nagy Iván: Magyarország családai
 Magyar Nemzetségi Zsebkönyv
 Vasárnapi Újság, 1874. 2. szám
 Részletes életrajza
 Viczay Heder lanya, Mari, a Mezriczky Paulaval valo viszonybol—1855 augusztus 30-an szuletett, Kovagorson.Anykonyvezve Kovago Eors-on.

1807 births
1873 deaths
Hungarian explorers
Hungarian archaeologists
Heder